Frederick Alexander Whitaker (1 March 1847 – 9 June 1887) was a 19th-century member of parliament in the Waikato region of New Zealand.

Whitaker was born in Pernambuco, Brazil, on 1 March 1847; he was the eldest son of Frederick Whitaker, New Zealand's 5th Premier. He married Kate Cox, the daughter of Alfred Cox, at Riverslea farm near Temuka in South Canterbury on 30 September 1879, three days after her 20th birthday. In the same ceremony, Cox's twin sister Marian married Francis Henry Barker, the fourth son of the late Dr Alfred Barker.

 

He committed suicide in the Auckland Club on 9 June 1887 triggered by losses from land speculation. He was given a private funeral and was buried alongside his mother in St. Stephen's Churchyard in Auckland.

References

1847 births
1887 deaths
Members of the New Zealand House of Representatives
New Zealand politicians who committed suicide
New Zealand MPs for North Island electorates
19th-century New Zealand politicians
Children of prime ministers of New Zealand
1880s suicides